The Arrows FA1 was a Formula One car used by the Arrows Grand Prix International team during the first half of the 1978 Formula One season. 

The FA1 was in reality a Shadow DN9, which Tony Southgate had designed for Shadow whilst working as a consultant for them. Southgate mistakenly believed that because he had designed the Shadow DN9 whilst working as a consultant (and not a Shadow employee) that he owned the intellectual rights to the Shadow DN9 design. Based on this misconception Arrows built the FA1, which was essentially a carbon copy of the DN9.

The FA1 was banned by the London High Courts partway through the 1978 season after a legal protest from the Shadow team, on the grounds was a blatant copy of the DN9. The judgement handed down ruled that over 70% of the FA1 was identical to the DN9 and that all four Arrows FA1's should be broken up by Arrows and their parts handed over to the Shadow team. 

Knowing it would lose the case, Arrows hurriedly designed and built a new car, the A1, whilst the court case was being heard and did not miss a race.

Complete Formula One World Championship results
(key) (Results in bold indicate pole position; results in italics indicate fastest lap)

 3 points scored using the A1.

References

FA1
Formula One controversies
Works involved in plagiarism controversies